The 1929 Southern Conference football season was the college football games played by the member schools of the Southern Conference as part of the 1929 college football season. The season began on September 21. Led by captain Bill Banker, the Tulane Green Wave posted a 9–0, undefeated record.

Regular season

SoCon teams in bold.

Week One

Week Two

Week Three

Week Four

Week Five

Week Six

Week Seven

Week Eight

Week Nine

Week Ten

Week Eleven

Week Twelve

Awards and honors

All-Americans

E – Vernon "Catfish" Smith, Georgia (AP-2; NEA-3)
E – Dale Van Sickel, Florida (CP-2)
T – Fred Sington, Alabama (AP-3; UP-2 [g]; INS-2 [g]; NYP-1; DW-2 [g])
G – Ray Farris, North Carolina (AP-3; NEA-2)
G – Bull Brown, Vanderbilt (NYS-2; NANA-1)
HB – Gene McEver, Tennessee (AP-2; UP-1; NEA-1; NANA-1; CP-1; NYP-2; DW-3)
HB – Bill Banker, Tulane (AP-3; UP-3 [fb]; NEA-2; INS-3; NYP-1; AAB-1; DW-1; LP-1)
FB – Tony Holm, Alabama (AP-1; INS-2)

All-Southern team

The following includes the composite All-Southern team of more than 50 coaches and sports writers compiled by the Associated Press.

References